Dholna is a village near Kasganj in Kanshi Ram Nagar district of Uttar Pradesh state of India.

References

Villages in Kasganj district